Na (or Narua, Mosuo) is a language of the Naish subbranch of the Naic group of the Sino-Tibetan languages.

Varieties
Yongning Na, which is spoken in Yongning Township, Ninglang County, Lijiang, Yunnan, China, has been documented by Jacques and Michaud (2011).

Lataddi Narua is notable for having only two tonal levels.

References

Qiangic languages
Languages of China